Lynette Burger (born 4 November 1980) is a South African former road cyclist. She represented her nation at the 2008 UCI Road World Championships. She won National Classic Cycle Race and Tshwane Diamond Classic in 2019.

Major results

2006
 2nd Time trial, National Road Championships
2008
 3rd Time trial, National Road Championships
2009
 African Road Championships
1st  Time trial
2nd  Road race
 National Road Championships
1st  Road race
2nd Time trial
2011
 All-Africa Games
1st  Road race
3rd  Time trial
2015
 1st  Team time trial, African Road Championships
 3rd Road race, National Road Championships
2018
 3rd Road race, National Road Championships

References

External links
 

1980 births
South African female cyclists
Living people
People from Krugersdorp
African Games bronze medalists for South Africa
African Games medalists in cycling
Competitors at the 2007 All-Africa Games
Competitors at the 2011 All-Africa Games
White South African people
21st-century South African women